Antoine Coupland (born December 12, 2003) is a Canadian professional soccer player who plays as a midfielder for Croatian club HNK Rijeka.

Club career

Early career
Before turning pro, Coupland was a member of Ottawa club St. Anthony SC's Futuro Soccer Academy programme. In July 2019, he was set to go on trial with English club Sheffield United, but turned down the opportunity to instead sign a professional contract with his hometown team, Ottawa Fury.

Ottawa Fury
On July 11, 2019, Coupland signed his first professional contract with Ottawa Fury FC. At the age of 15 years old, Coupland became the youngest first-team player in the club's history and one of the youngest professional players in Canada. Coupland made his debut for the Fury on July 20, 2019, coming off the bench in the final minutes of the game in a 4–0 victory over Swope Park Rangers. After one season with the Fury, the club would cease operations for the 2020 season, making Coupland a free agent.

Atlético Ottawa
On March 5, 2020, Coupland signed with new Canadian Premier League side Atlético Ottawa. He made his debut on August 19 against Valour FC. He played in three of the club's seven total matches during the season, which was drastically shortened due to the COVID-19 pandemic, playing a total of 98 minutes. He re-signed with the club for the 2021 season January 25, 2021. On July 11, Coupland scored his first professional goal, netting the second against Cavalry FC in a 2–0 victory. In November 2021, after Ottawa's elimination from playoff contention, Coupland announced he was going on trial with clubs in Portugal.

Rijeka
On February 6, 2022, Coupland signed with the first team of Croatian First Football League side HNK Rijeka.

International career
On May 13, 2022 Coupland was named to the 60-man provisional Canadian U-20 team for the 2022 CONCACAF U-20 Championship.

Career statistics

Club

References

External links
 

Living people
2003 births
Association football midfielders
Canadian soccer players
Soccer people from Quebec
People from Chelsea, Quebec
Canadian expatriate soccer players
Expatriate footballers in Croatia
Canadian expatriate sportspeople in Croatia
Ottawa Fury FC players
Atlético Ottawa players
HNK Rijeka players
USL Championship players
Canadian Premier League players